This list of botanical gardens and arboretums in North Carolina is intended to include all significant botanical gardens and arboretums in the U.S. state of North Carolina.

See also
List of botanical gardens and arboretums in the United States

References 

 
 
Tourist attractions in North Carolina
botanical gardens and arboretums in North Carolina